David H. Tabor is a United States Air Force major general who serves as the director of programs of the United States Air Force. He most recently served as the Commander of the Special Operations Command Europe. Previously, he was the Assistant Commanding General of the Joint Special Operations Command.

Military career
In June 2022, it was announced that Tabor would succeed Richard G. Moore as director of programs of the United States Air Force.

References

References

 

Living people
Place of birth missing (living people)
Recipients of the Defense Superior Service Medal
Recipients of the Distinguished Flying Cross (United States)
Recipients of the Legion of Merit
United States Air Force generals
United States Air Force personnel of the War in Afghanistan (2001–2021)
Year of birth missing (living people)